Woodrow Peoples, Jr. (August 16, 1943 – October 12, 2010) was an American football offensive lineman.  The undrafted Grambling State University standout was a two-time Pro Bowler with the San Francisco 49ers, and a member of the 1980 National Football Conference (NFC) champion Philadelphia Eagles during his 13-year National Football League (NFL) career.

Peoples was inducted into the American Football Association's Semi Pro Football Hall of Fame in 1989.

References

External links
Woody Peoples's NFL career stats at the Football Database

1943 births
2010 deaths
American football offensive guards
Grambling State Tigers football players
Philadelphia Eagles players
San Francisco 49ers players
National Conference Pro Bowl players
Players of American football from Birmingham, Alabama